Dan Hannon is an American record producer, audio engineer, mixer, songwriter, and musician. He has produced, co-produced, co-written, and performed on albums that have sold over 4.5 million copies, that have been streamed over one billion times. His current Billboard chart success includes two number one albums, three number one songs, 13 top ten albums, 15 top twenty albums, three top ten rock albums, and four top ten alternative albums. Dan co-produced the album Cope, released on April 1, 2014, with the Manchester Orchestra and went on to produce the Simple Math album, which was released on May 10, 2011, for Manchester Orchestra.

In 2008, he was enlisted to co-produce their second release, Mean Everything To Nothing, with Joe Chiccarelli, resulting in the top ten rock hit "I've Got Friends".

Hannon produced, recorded, mixed, and co-wrote "Anything Worth Saying" by Aaron Shust, which became the number one Christian record in 2006 and was nominated for six Dove Awards, winning three  at the 38th GMA Dove Awards. The song "My Savior My God" is Billboard's number two Christian/Gospel song of the decade of the 2000s. Hannon was nominated for a Dove Award for 'Pop Contemporary Album' of the year in 2007 for Shust's second release, Whispered and Shouted.

Discography
P = Producer  •  M = Mixer  •  E = Engineer  •  I = Instrumentalist  •  W = Writer  •  AP = Additional Production

Awards and acknowledgments
 No. 1 Song of the Year for 2006 on R&R and CRW charts for Aaron Shust's "My Savior, My God"
 No. 2 Song of the Decade (Billboard Best of 2000's Christian Songs) for Aaron Shust's "My Savior, My God"
 Six Top 10 AC singles for Aaron Shust
 Three BMI Publishing Most Performed Songs on Radio Awards

References

1973 births
Living people
American record producers
American rock musicians
Place of birth missing (living people)